Chris Dowling is an American screenwriter and film director. He is known as screenwriter of the films Blue Miracle (2021) and Priceless (2016) and co-writer of the film Acidman (2022). Dowling wrote and directed the films Where Hope Grows (2014) and Roll With It (2022). He was co-writer and director of the 2019 film, Run the Race.

Early life
Dowling was born in Flowood, Mississippi and grew up in Dallas, Texas. After graduating from the University of Texas with a degree in Radio/Television/Film, he moved to Los Angeles in 2009.

Film awards and honors
Acidman, a 2022 American film directed by Alex Lehmann and written by Lehmann and Dowling, received the Grand Jury Prize for Best Narrative Feature at the 2022 Dallas International Film Festival.

Roll With It, a 2022 American film written and directed by Dowling, was the Audience Award Winner for Best Narrative Feature at the 2022 Dallas International Film Festival.

Blue Miracle, a 2021 American drama film directed by Julio Quintana from a screenplay by Quintana and Dowling, was nominated for the GMA Dove Award for Inspirational Film/Series of the Year at the 2022 GMA Dove Awards.

Blue Miracle received the Movieguide Epiphany Award as “Most Inspiring Movie of 2021”. 

Where Hope Grows, which Dowling wrote and directed, received the 2014 Heartland Film Festival Audience Choice Award Winner, Narrative Feature,

Filmography 
As director
 2004 – The Plight of Clownana
 2009 – Rock Slyde
 2014 – Where Hope Grows
 2018 – Run the Race
 2022 – Roll With It

As writer
2004 – The Plight of Clownana
2009 – Rock Slyde
2014 – The Remaining
2014 – Where Hope Grows
2016 – Priceless
2018 – Run the Race
2019 – The World We Make
2021 – Blue Miracle
2022 – Acidman

As producer
2011 - RepoGames
2016 - Asperger's Are Us
2019 - On Tour With Aspergers Are Us

References

External links

People from Flowood, Mississippi
American film directors
American screenwriters
Living people
Year of birth missing (living people)